Hellas, or Ellas may refer to:

Places in Greece 
Ἑλλάς (Ellás), genitive Ἑλλάδος (Elládos), an ancient Greek toponym used to refer to: 
 Greece as a whole, as the main name its modern inhabitants know it by.
 The region of Achaea Phthiotis in Thessaly
  According to legend, a city in Phthiotis, founded by Hellen
  Continental Greece, as opposed to the Peloponnese peninsula and the Greek islands
 A name for all lands inhabited by Hellenes, i.e. all of ancient Greece, including the Greek colonies
 Hellas (theme), a Byzantine province in southern Greece

Sports clubs
 Hellas Verona F.C., an Italian football (soccer) club based in Verona
 SoIK Hellas, sports club in Stockholm, Sweden
 South Melbourne FC, a football (soccer) club formerly known as South Melbourne Hellas
 West Adelaide Soccer Club, a football (soccer) club formerly known as West Adelaide Hellas

On Mars
 Hellas quadrangle, a region of Mars
 Hellas Planitia, a plain within the impact basin associated with the albedo feature Hellas on Mars
 Hellas Montes, a mountain range on Mars

Ships
 Greek frigate Hellas (1826-1831), the first flagship of the modern Hellenic Navy
   (1859-1906)
 SS Taroona (1935-1989), an Australian transport ship of World War II; later sold and converted into a cruise ship named the Hellas

Other uses
 Hellas (poem), by Percy Bysshe Shelley
 Ellas (TV series), a Mexican telenovela
 AK Hellas, a Greek truck manufacturer
 Hellas (personification), feminine representation of Greece

See also
 Greece (disambiguation)
 Helles
 Hellenic (disambiguation)